Deborah Thomas is an Australian magazine editor and businesswoman, born in December 1955. Her career in magazine publishing started at Cleo magazine as beauty and lifestyle editor in 1987. She became deputy editor at Cleo in 1990, and was editor at Mode in 1992 (now Harper's Bazaar) followed by Elle magazine in 1994, until she took over the editorship at Cleo from 1997 to 1999, where she "revive[d] the magazine's falling circulation and advertising revenue".

Following Cleo magazine, Thomas became editor-in-chief of The Australian Women's Weekly in 1999 and was awarded Magazine of the Year as well as Editor of the Year in 2002 for her efforts in revitalising the magazine for the new millennium.   After nearly 10 years at The Weekly including a year as Editorial Director, Thomas became the Director of Media, Public Affairs & Brand Development across Bauer Media's portfolio of 70-plus titles. Her role included establishing new revenue streams such as brand licensing and retail products. Deborah was also Executive Director of the Bangkok Post Media /ACP joint venture in Thailand.

Deborah was appointed to the Council of the National Library of Australia (NLA) in 2006 for three, three-year terms, taking on the role of Deputy Chair from 2013-2016. The NLA Council was charged with overseeing the construction of major IT infrastructure required to create a comprehensive digital library to enable all Australians online access to the National Collection. Deborah was Chair of the NLA Governance Committee as well as a member of the Audit and Risk Committee. 

In April 2015 she was appointed as chief executive officer of  ASX listed, Ardent Leisure which owned five separate businesses including GoodLife Health Clubs, AMF & Kingpin Bowling, d'Albora Marinas, Main Event (US) and Dreamworld. A few months after an accident that killed four people on the Thunder River Rapids Ride at Dreamworld, Thomas resigned from her position as CEO of Ardent Leisure in 2017.

Thomas was appointed her current role as CEO of national children's cancer charity, Camp Quality in 2020, adding to her portfolio in the non-for-profit sector. In February 2023, Camp Quality was recognised as a finalist in the NSW Telstra Business Awards, in two categories: Championing Health and Building Communities. 

A strong advocate for diversity, with a robust track record of supporting and mentoring women, Deborah was a Non-Executive Director of the Federal Government’s, National Breast and Ovarian Cancer Centre. She has been involved in many NFP organisations including the Royal Hospital for Women Foundation, Father Chris Riley’s Youth off the Streets and is a founding patron of the Taronga Conservation Foundation and was Chair of the Ensemble Theatre Foundation.  

In 2012 Deborah was elected to local government as a Councillor for Woollahra, completing her five-year term in August 2017. 

Deborah is a member of Chief Executive Women and also founded 'Gold Week' for the Sydney Children's Hospital, the signature fundraising event for the hospital with a telethon now held annually on the Nine Network.

Bibliography

References

1952 births
Living people
Australian journalists
Australian women journalists
Australian magazine editors
Australian radio personalities
Australian women radio presenters
Australian women chief executives
Australian women editors
Women magazine editors
National Library of Australia Council members